Black Joy is a DVD by Psychic TV. The DVD includes live and music videos. The DVD is composed of two prior VHS projects, Black and Joy.

Chapters
Joy
 "Your Body"
 "We Kiss"
 "She Was Surprised"
 "RU Xperienced"
 "Candy Says"
 "Wicked"
 "Just Like Arcadia"
 "Joy"
 "IC Water (promo)"
Black
 "Intoxication"
 "Surrender"
 "Horror House"
 "Jigsaw"
 "Money For E"
 "Black"

External links 

 Record Collector review
 The Wire article mentioning the release

Psychic TV albums
2004 video albums
2004 live albums
Live video albums
2004 compilation albums
Music video compilation albums